Robert Mitchell (born 13 May 1963) is a Canadian politician.
Mitchell was elected to the Legislative Assembly of Prince Edward Island in the 2007 provincial election. He represented the electoral district of Charlottetown-Winsloe as a member of the Liberal Party until 2020.

On May 20, 2015, Mitchell was appointed to the Executive Council of Prince Edward Island as Minister of Communities, Land and Environment. On January 10, 2018, Mitchell was moved to Minister of Health and Wellness in a cabinet shuffle.

From May 8 to September 9, 2019, he served as interim leader of the Liberal Party on Prince Edward Island.

On September 3, 2020, he stepped down from his political position as MLA for Charlottetown-Winsloe, after thirteen years in political service for both provincial districts.

References

External links
 Robert Mitchell

Living people
Members of the Executive Council of Prince Edward Island
People from Charlottetown
Prince Edward Island Liberal Party MLAs
21st-century Canadian politicians
1963 births